L'entourage is a French hip hop crew composed of several bands and solo artists founded in 2008. The members emanated from the battle-rap contest Rap Contenders as well as support of many artists and bands.

The collective's first studio album "Jeunes Entrepreneurs" was launched by Believe Recordings on 26 May 2014 with a premier concert at the Paris Olympia on 14 June 2014 with all members of the collective on stage.

Members
Nekfeu is a main contributor. The collective also includes three of his S-Crew: 2zer, Framal, and Mekra.

Nekfeu, Alpha Wann, and Fonky Flav' are also from the earlier rap formation 1995.

Members in alphabetical order are: 
2zer Washington 
Abou
Alpha Wann
Candy Cotton
Deen Burbigo
Doum's
Eff Gee
Fonky Flav' 
Framal 
Jazzy Bazz
Mekra 
Nekfeu

Discography

Albums

Singles

Videography

List of music videos:

 2014: "Les Rois"
 2014: "Soixante Quinze"
 2014: "Bal Masqué"
 2014: "Toujours là"
 2014: "Jim Morrison"
 2014: "Caramello"
 2012:  "Les choses se passent" with Casse Croute
 2012: "Introduction"
 2011: "Plus à gagner qu'à perdre"

References

Musical collectives